Susan Hayhurst (December 25, 1820 – August 7, 1909) was an American physician, pharmacist, and educator, and the first woman to receive a pharmacy degree in the United States.

Biography
Susan Hayhurst was born in Middletown Township, Bucks County, Pennsylvania, the daughter of Quakers Thomas and Martha Hayhurst. She attended school in Wilmington, Delaware and excelled in mathematics. While still a young girl she worked as a teacher at country schools in Bucks County. Taking an interest in chemistry and physiology, she enrolled at the Woman's Medical College of Pennsylvania, and went on to graduate with a degree in medicine in 1857.

She served as principal of the Friends' School in Philadelphia from 1857 to 1867, and for a time operated her own school which was attended by many of her former students. During the American Civil War, she was chairman of the Committee of Supplies of the Pennsylvania Relief Association.

In 1876, Hayhurst became the head of the pharmaceutical department at the Woman's Hospital of Philadelphia. To broaden her knowledge of the subject, she began attending lectures at the Philadelphia College of Pharmacy. Though Dr. Clara Marshall had previously done so, it was rare for the college to admit women, and Hayhurst was the only woman in her class of 150. The college administration did not offer any resistance, however, and granted her a diploma in pharmacy when she completed her courses in 1883, at age 63.

Hayhurst remained in her post at the pharmaceutical department of the Woman's Hospital for 33 years. She supervised the purchase and manufacture of supplies, assisted missionaries to foreign countries, and acted as mentor to 65 women pharmacists. She was a member of organizations such as the New Century Club, New Century Guild, American Academy of Political and Social Science, and Woman's Suffrage Society of Philadelphia.

Susan Hayhurst died in Philadelphia on August 7, 1909, after an illness of four days. The Philadelphia College of Pharmacy held a memorial service in her honor on November 15, 1910, and commissioned a painting of her to be hung in its museum.

See also
 Elizabeth Gooking Greenleaf
 Elizabeth Marshall (pharmacist)

References

Further reading

1820 births
1909 deaths
Schoolteachers from Pennsylvania
19th-century American women educators
American Quakers
People from Bucks County, Pennsylvania
University of the Sciences alumni
Woman's Medical College of Pennsylvania alumni
Women academic administrators
American academic administrators
Women pharmacists
19th-century American women physicians
19th-century American physicians
19th-century American educators